David  John Perry (born 9 April 1942), commonly known as the Puppet Man, is a  street entertainer from Norwich, Norfolk, England. He now resides in Great Yarmouth, whose performance consists of dancing with a range of puppets while singing along to pop songs played on a portable karaoke machine. Attracting fans and hatred alike, he has been repeatedly featured in the local news media of East Anglia such as the Eastern Daily Press and the Norwich Evening News. Lately he has also found fans on internet sites such as the video-sharing platform YouTube or the social network website Facebook.

Style
Using a karaoke machine, the puppets dance while Perry sings his own interpretations over songs by Elvis Presley and The Beatles. He  first started performing as the Norwich Puppet Man in the mid-1990s, but in 1997 was forced to quit when his incapacity benefit was stopped because he was earning money through busking. He returned to busking on Gentleman's Walk in late 2005 or early 2006, by which time internet sites had begun to spread his fame. He does not hold, nor does he require a buskers licence to busk in either Norwich or Great Yarmouth.
He usually performs in pedestrian zones located in the city centre of Norwich and town centre of Great Yarmouth, typically two or three times a week and mainly in the afternoons and on weekends. In Norwich, the Puppet Man can mostly be found on Gentleman's Walk off St Peter Mancroft and the old Haymarket around the bottom of Hay Hill. In Great Yarmouth he is usually found on Regent Road, close to the entrance to the Market Gates Shopping Centre..

Over the years, Perry's eccentric style of “dancing in the city centre behind his ghetto blaster and waving his puppets in time to an eclectic range of music” has made the Puppet Man a cult figure in Norwich and Great Yarmouth. In a competition organised by the Castle Quarter Shopping Centre in June 2007 titled “The faces that sum up why Norwich is such a fine city”, he was named as one of the “25 Faces of Norwich”.

In summer 2008, Perry was hired by a nightclub in Norwich to perform some live action in front of 2,000 people for a student based event. In August 2008, the Puppet Man publicly announced that he was going to stop busking in Norwich and move his activities to Great Yarmouth, but has since continued to appear in Norwich on a regular basis.

Puppets
The puppets David Perry has used since appearing as the Norwich Puppet Man are:
 “Swearing Geordie Man” (after Swearing Geordie Michael Rice)
 “Dougal” (a purple dog, on string)
 “Roy Waller” (a snake hand puppet made out of an old worn sock)
 “Billy McDog” (a canine hand puppet)
 “Gary” (a banana eating gorilla, named after Gary Glitter)
 “Mick” (a dog puppet, named after Mick Jagger)
 “Big Brenda” (named after David Perry's wife)
 “Basil” (a cunning fox)
 “Suzy” (a sassy squirrel)
 “Franny” (named after local Mattishall man, Adam Francis)
 “Slug head” (a shell-less terrestrial gastropod mollusc that resembles Martin Emms)
 “Gary Lemon” (named after his best friend Gary who likes lemons)
While the provenance of the first six puppets is unknown, “Basil” and “Suzy” were donated in June 2007 by the owners of “Langley's”, a Norwich toy shop located in Royal Arcade on Gentleman's Walk. Commenting on the puppets, Perry said about the gifts: "Some people don’t like my singing. I was pleased to get the new puppets. I’ve named the fox Basil and the squirrel is his girlfriend Suzy. Basil likes to dance to the Beatles and Suzy sometimes makes an appearance. Basil was a relation to Basil Brush and now he’s been made to work on the street he’s not happy about it."

Public perception
Over the years, the Norwich Puppet Man has built up a cult following. As a local original, he has even appeared in a series of postcards of Norfolk, claiming to capture unappreciated parts of the county. A group set up in his honour on the social network website Facebook gained more than 4,000 members, and tens of thousands of viewers have watched clips of him that were posted on the video website YouTube.

While Perry's peculiar brand of entertainment has undoubtedly made him locally famous, the quality of the Puppet Man's performances remains controversial. Some describe him as a "legend" and a "great favourite with many shoppers in Gentleman’s Walk", others find him to be "a noisy obstruction totally bereft of any skill or creativity"., and others still describe him as falling simultaneously into both categories. Whilst others just describe him as "The Yarco Noncey Puppet Man".  When Perry was named one of the “25 Faces of
Norwich”, a local shop manager said about the Puppet Man that he "adds fun to the streets of Norwich, he puts a smile on hundreds of people’s faces every day" while an angry letter from an anonymous reader of the Norwich Evening News branded him a "dullard, in a backwater of inbreeding".

In line with his varied public perception, Perry has not only been featured in local newspapers and on the internet but also become subject to abuse by some people and sometimes even violence. In September 2010, he was reported to have been attacked in Great Yarmouth by an unhappy shop owner causing county-wide outrage. In January 2015, the announcement of Radio 1's Big Weekend in Norwich, Perry was featured as a cult figure in the city on the BBC Newsbeat website.

See also
 Normal for Norfolk

References

People from Norwich
English puppeteers
1942 births
Living people
English buskers